Denmark is a Nordic country located in Northern Europe. It consists of the Jutland Peninsula and several islands in the Baltic Sea, referred to as the Danish Archipelago. Denmark is located southwest of Sweden and due south of Norway and is bordered by the German state (and former possession) Schleswig-Holstein to the south, on Denmark's only land border, 68 kilometres (42 miles) long.

Denmark borders both the Baltic and North seas along its  tidal shoreline. The land area of Denmark is estimated to be . However, it cannot be stated exactly since the ocean constantly erodes and adds material to the coastline, and there are human land reclamation projects. A recent global remote sensing analysis suggested that there were 607km² of tidal flats in Denmark, making it the 42nd ranked country in terms of tidal flat extent.

A circle enclosing the same total area as Denmark would have a diameter of 234 km (146 miles). Denmark has 443 named islands (1,419 islands above 100 m2), of which 72 are inhabited (Statistics Denmark). The largest islands are Zealand (Sjælland) and Funen (Fyn). The island of Bornholm is located east of the rest of the country, in the Baltic Sea. Many of the larger islands are connected by bridges; the Øresund Bridge connects Zealand with Sweden; the Great Belt Bridge connects Funen with Zealand; and the Little Belt Bridge connects Jutland with Funen. Ferries or small aircraft connect to the smaller islands. Main cities are the capital Copenhagen on Zealand; Århus, Aalborg and Esbjerg in Jutland; and Odense on Funen.

Denmark experiences a temperate climate. This means that the winters are mild and windy and the summers are cool. The local terrain is generally flat with a few gently rolling plains. The territory of Denmark includes the island of Bornholm in the Baltic Sea and the rest of metropolitan Denmark, but excludes the Faroe Islands and Greenland. Its position gives Denmark complete control of the Danish Straits (Skagerrak and Kattegat) linking the Baltic and North Seas. The country's natural resources include petroleum, natural gas, fish, salt, limestone, chalk, stone, gravel, and sand.

Environment

Climate

Land use
Arable land: 55.99%  Permanent crops: 0.14%  Other: 42.87% (2012)

Irrigated land: 4,354 km2 (2007)

Total renewable water resources: 6 km3 (2011)

Freshwater withdrawal (domestic/industrial/agricultural):
total: 0.66 km3/yr (58%/5%/36%)
 per capita: 118.4 m3/yr (2009)

Land reclamation 
In 2019, the government proposed building 9 new artificial islands, named project Holmene, which would create 3 sq km of reclaimed land, to be built from 2022-2040. 

In June 2021, lawmakers approved the construction of a 3 sq km island, named Lynetteholm, in the Copenhagen Harbor. A spokesperson for the Climate Movement in Denmark (Klimabevægelsen i Danmark) said the organization would sue the government over environmental concerns.

Agriculture 
 Denmark has plenty of rain, flat landscape, and moderate climate. With 55.99% of its land considered as arable, Denmark has model characteristics for agriculture. 61% of the country's total area is cultivated  Farms in Denmark are remarkably large, averaging 172.9 acres per farm. Additionally, homesteads exceeding 247 acres make up more than 20% in Denmark. Many of these large farms harvest fruits and vegetables, the leading exports from Denmark are meat, fur, and dairy products. The animal's diets in Denmark consist of mainly cereals since they are the dominant field crop. 75% of all cereal produced in Denmark is feed to the four most produced animals which are pigs, cattle, chicken and mink. Denmark overproduces about 66% of food production compared to their own population size (5.7 million) being that they are able to feed 15 million people. This is a byproduct of being highly productive within the Danish agricultural production.
 In 1961, Denmark's Agricultural land represented 74.5% of land area. Fifty-six years later to 2015, Denmark has decreased its amount of Agricultural land down to 62.1% then to 61% one year later in reference to "Facts and Figures - Danish Agriculture and Food" The decrease in agricultural land comes as farmers are being well educated and the intensive amount of research and development is being implemented. It begins with advancements in agro-technology. The results have improved fertilization and nutrient use on arable land. Digestibility and nutrient uptake are developing from the improvements of new methods that are being implemented. Examples of these new methods are the addition of enzymes and microbial cultures.

Natural hazards
Flooding is a threat in some areas of the country

Current issues
Air pollution, principally from vehicle and power plant emissions
Nitrogen and phosphorus pollution of the North Sea
Drinking and surface water becoming polluted from animal wastes and pesticides

International agreements
 Party to: Air Pollution, Air Pollution-Nitrogen Oxides, Air Pollution-Sulphur 85, Air Pollution-Sulphur 94, Air Pollution-Volatile Organic Compounds, Antarctic Treaty, Biodiversity, Climate Change, Desertification, Endangered Species, Environmental Modification, Hazardous Wastes, Law of the Sea, Marine Dumping, Marine Life Conservation, Nuclear Test Ban, Ozone Layer Protection, Ship Pollution, Tropical Timber 83, Tropical Timber 94, Wetlands, Whaling
 Signed, but not ratified: Air Pollution-Persistent Organic Pollutants, Antarctic-Environmental Protocol, Climate Change-Kyoto Protocol

Transnational issues

Maritime claims

Contiguous zone:   
Continental shelf: 200-m depth or to the depth of exploitation  
Exclusive economic zone:  (excludes Greenland and Faroe Islands).   
Territorial sea:

Other issues
Iceland disputes the Faroe Islands' fisheries median line.
Iceland, Ireland and the United Kingdom dispute Denmark's claim that the Faroe Islands' continental shelf extends beyond 200 nautical miles or about 370 km.
The Faroe Islands continue to study proposals for full independence.
Denmark is currently investigating the extent of the continental shelf of Greenland, in the hope that Greenland's Exclusive Economic Zone can be expanded. One of the areas investigated is the geographical North Pole.

Population

Urban population 
Denmark's urban population accounts for 87.9% of its total population, with a 0.51% rate of change in urbanization. Copenhagen remains the largest city in Denmark with a population of 1.2 million people and a metro population of 1.99 million. Copenhagen became Denmark's Capital in 1443 and now currently sits with a population density of 6,800 people per square kilometer.
About a quarter of Danes live in the capital Copenhagen.

See also
Danish Realm
ISO 3166-2:DK
List of islands of Denmark
NUTS statistical regions of Denmark
UN/LOCODE:DK

Notes

Footnotes

Reference

External links

 Map of Denmark from the Atlas “Theatrum orbis terrarum” by Abraham Ortelius. It's the first printed map of Denmark.